Closed may refer to:

Mathematics
 Closure (mathematics), a set, along with operations, for which applying those operations on members always results in a member of the set
 Closed set, a set which contains all its limit points
 Closed interval, an interval which includes its endpoints
 Closed line segment, a line segment which includes its endpoints
 Closed manifold, a compact manifold which has no boundary

Other uses
 Closed (poker), a betting round where no player will have the right to raise
 Closed (album), a 2010 album by Bomb Factory
 Closed GmbH, a German fashion brand
 Closed class, in linguistics, a class of words or other entities which rarely changes

See also
 
 Close (disambiguation)
 Closed loop (disambiguation)
 Closing (disambiguation)
 Closure (disambiguation)
 Open (disambiguation)